The 560th Fighter-Day Squadron is an inactive United States Air Force unit.  Its last was assigned to the 12th Fighter-Day Wing, stationed at Bergstrom Air Force Base, Texas.  It was inactivated on 8 January 1958.

History
Established in early 1941 as a coastal patrol light bomber squadron, assigned to the Northwest Air District (later Second Air Force). Deployed to Louisiana to fly antisubmarine patrols over the Gulf of Mexico after the Pearl Harbor Attack, equipped with B-18 Bolos. Trained with B-25 Mitchells in Louisiana under Third Air Force, then after several months in Louisiana, moved to Central California and received new B-25s from North American, being trained as a medium bombardment squadron.

Was deployed to Egypt in July 1942, flying via the South Atlantic Transport Route, then across Central Africa to Eritrea, then north to Cairo arriving at RAF Deversoir in early August. Assigned to the new Ninth Air Force in November while engaging in tactical bombardment and strafing missions against enemy armor and troop concentrations; also attacked enemy bases and columns in the rear area behind the lines in western Egypt and Libya. Moved west supporting the British Eighth Army's advance in the Western Desert Campaign into Tunisia. Was reassigned to Twelfth Air Force in Southern Italy in November 1943, flying tactical bombardment missions supporting the United States Fifth Army's drive northwards during the Italian campaign. Reassigned to the China Burma India Theater (CBI) in February 1944, moving via the Middle East to eastern India. Supported the British forces in Burma, attacking Japanese transport routes and troop concentrations. Began receiving A-26 Invaders in the early summer of 1945, replacing the B-25s. Remained in the CBI until the Japanese Capitulation in August 1945, being demobilized in India in the fall. Inactivated as a paper unit in the United States in January 1946.

Reactivated under Tactical Air Command in May 1947 as a light bomber squadron, but neither manned or equipped. Inactivated in September 1948. Reactivated in November 1950 under Strategic Air Command as an F-84G Thunderjet Fighter squadron, assigned to Turner AFB. Flew fighter-escort training missions with SAC B-50 and B-36 strategic bombers. The strategic fighter concept became redundant with the introduction of B-47 and B-52 jet bombers which could fly higher and faster than the first-generation F-86 escort fighters, and was reassigned to Tactical Air Command in 1957. TAC sent the Thunderjets to second-line Air National Guard and reserve squadrons, personnel reassigned to other units. Inactivated due to budget constraints in January 1958.

Lineage
 Constituted 82d Bombardment Squadron (Light) on 20 Nov 1940.
 Activated on 15 Jan 1941
 Redesignated 82d Bombardment Squadron (Medium) on 30 Dec 1941
 Inactivated on 22 Jan 1946.
 Redesignated 82d Bombardment Squadron (Light) on 29 Apr 1947
 Activated on 19 May 1947
 Inactivated on 10 Sep 1948
 Redesignated 560th Fighter-Escort Squadron on 27 Oct 1950
 Activated on 1 Nov 1950
 Redesignated: 560th Strategic Fighter Squadron on 20 Jan 1953
 Redesignated: 560th Fighter-Day Squadron on 1 Jul 1957
 Inactivated on 8 Jan 1958

Assignments
 12th Bombardment Group, 15 Jan 1941-22 Jan 1946; 19 May 1947-10 Sep 1948
 12th Fighter-Escort Group, 1 Nov 1950
 12th Fighter Escort (later Strategic Fighter; Fighter-Day) Wing, 18 Jun 1952-8 Jan 1958

Stations

 McChord Field, Washington, 15 Jan 1941
 Esler Field, Louisiana, 27 Feb-3 Jul 1942
 Operated from Stockton Field, California, 24 May-24 Jun 1942
 RAF Deversoir, Egypt, 2 Aug 1942
 Landing Ground 88, Egypt, 15 Oct 1942
 RAF Gambut, Libya, 5 Dec 1942;
 Magrun Landing Ground, Libya, 14 Dec 1942
 RAF Gambut, Libya, 16 Dec 1942
 Tmed El Chel Airfield, Libya, 10 Jan 1943
 Berteaux Airfield, Algeria, 4 Feb 1943
 Canrobert Airfield, Algeria, 15 Mar 1943
 Thibar Airfield, Tunisia, 1 May 1943
 Hergla Airfield, Tunisia, 2 Jun 1943
 Ponte Olivo Airfield, Sicily, c. 2 Aug 1943

 Gerbini Airfield, Sicily, 22 Aug 1943
 Foggia Airfield, Italy, 3 Nov 1943
 Gaudo Airfield, Italy, 19 Jan- 4 Feb 1944
 Tezgaon Airfield, India, ig Mar 1944
 Pandaveswar Airfield, India, 15 Jun 1944
 Fenny Airfield, India, 20 Ju1 1944
 Operated from Myitkyina Airfield, Burma, 10-28 Apr 1945
 Madhaiganj Airfield, India, 8 Jun 1945
 Karachi Airport, India, 18 Nov-24 Dec 1945
 Fort Lawton, Washington, 21-22 Jan 1946
 Langley Field, Virginia, 19 May 1947-10 Sep 1948
 Turner AFB, Georgia, 1 Nov 1950
 Bergstrom AFB, Texas, 5 Dec 1950-8 Jan 1958

Aircraft
 PT-17 Stearman, 1941-1942
 B-18 Bolo, 1942-1942
 B-25 Mitchell, 1942-1945
 A-26 Invader, 1945
 F-84 Thunderjet, 1951-1957

References

 Maurer, Maurer (1983). Air Force Combat Units of World War II. Maxwell AFB, AL: Office of Air Force History. .

Fighter squadrons of the United States Air Force